Marvin Martin (born 10 January 1988) is a French professional footballer who plays for Championnat National 2 club Hyères. He plays as a creative play-making midfielder and is described as a player with "very good technique on the ball" and "excellent vision", which compensates for his relatively small frame. Martin is a former France international, having appeared for his country at UEFA Euro 2012.

Club career

Early career
Martin was born in the 14th arrondissement of Paris and hails from the Porte de Vanves area. He therefore grew up close to the Parc des Princes and regularly attended Paris Saint-Germain games, developing a passion for the French capital club. He began his football career at Club Athlétique de Paris at the age of six and, after two years at the club, joined sports club Montrouge CF in the southern Parisian suburbs. Martin's commitment to football accelerated after the France national team won the 1998 FIFA World Cup. He described the victory as "the moment I wanted become a professional player". While playing at Montrouge, Martin trained and played alongside Hatem Ben Arfa, Issiar Dia, Flavien Belson and Dominique Malonga. The quartet were beneficial to the under-13 team that won the Coupe de Paris in 1997, defeating PSG in the final.

After showing potential at Montrouge, Martin attended trials at the Clairefontaine academy with hopes of earning selection to the prestigious school. Following the conclusion of the camp, however, he was not selected, though his domestic teammate Hatem Ben Arfa was. Citing the player's failure to earn a spot at Clairefontaine, a coach at Montrouge later stated, "I do not know if it gave him added strength, but in any case, he continued to work instead of feeling sorry for himself." In 2002, Martin drew interest from professional club Sochaux after being spotted by club scout Christian Puxel. Club officials offered the player a trial. He accepted the offer and made the trek east to Montbéliard. In July 2002, Martin signed an aspirant (youth) contract with the club after impressing during a trial match held at the Stade Auguste Bonal.

Sochaux
Upon his arrival to the club, Martin was inserted into the club's prestigious youth academy and quickly developed a rapport with future teammates Ryad Boudebouz, Sloan Privat, Geoffrey Tulasne and Frédéric Duplus. Martin was influenced to train hard in the academy by former club player Camel Meriem, as well as academy graduates Jérémy Ménez and Mevlüt Erdinç who established themselves at Sochaux at a young age. In 2007, he played on the club's under-19 team that won the Coupe Gambardella. Sochaux defeated Auxerre 5–4 on penalties in the final match, which was played at the Stade de France. As a result of the youth team's cup success, several players on the team, including Martin, were promoted to the club's Championnat de France Amateur team in the fourth division. In the 2007–08 Championnat de France Amateur season, Martin appeared in a team-high 32 matches and scored three goals as the reserve team finished fourth in its group.

Following the conclusion of the 2007–08 season, Martin signed his first professional contract after agreeing to a three-year deal with the club. He was, subsequently, promoted to the senior team and assigned the number 26 shirt by manager Francis Gillot. Martin made his professional debut on 30 August 2008 in a 2–1 league defeat to Marseille, appearing as a substitute. Two weeks later, he made his first professional start in a 2–1 loss to Toulouse. In the team's next four league matches, Gillot inserted Martin as a starter. After the stint of consecutive starts, he rotated between the bench and the first eleven for the rest of the campaign. On 13 May 2009, Martin scored his first professional goal in a 3–0 victory over Monaco. He finished the campaign with 30 total appearances scoring only one goal.

In the 2009–10 season, following the departure of Romain Pitau, Martin was inserted into the starting lineup as his replacement by Gillot for the season. He was a vocal point in the midfield assisting on a goal in the team's second match of the season against Bordeaux. On 26 September 2009, he scored a goal in a 2–1 loss against Nancy and, in the following week, netted the game-winning goal against Le Mans. On 21 January 2010, Martin signed a contract extension with the club until 2014. Martin's play-making abilities began to develop and flourish during the season as he assisted on game-winning goals in victories over Lorient, Rennes and Lille. In the Coupe de France, he contributed to the club's reaching the quarter-finals as he scored a double in a 4–1 rout of amateur club Beauvais in the Round of 16. Martin finished the successful individual campaign with 40 total appearances, four goals and four assists.

Martin's importance within the team was further bolstered in the 2010–11 season after the departure of the club's primary playmaker, Stéphane Dalmat. Martin switched to the number 14 shirt in reference to the 14th arrondissement of Paris and was tipped to replace him by Gillot. The young midfielder responded positively and scored his first goal of the season on 14 August 2010 in a 3–2 loss against Saint-Étienne. The following month, he scored a goal described by the local media as a "moment of magic" in a 4–0 victory over Nice. Martin developed a strong simpatico with strikers Brown Ideye and Modibo Maïga, as well as winger Nicolas Maurice-Belay assisting on several of each player's goals. By the end of January 2011, Martin had assisted on a league-leading ten goals, which included both goals in the team's 2–1 win over Arles-Avignon on 7 August, another two in a 3–1 win against Caen, and one in a 5–1 thrashing of Rennes on 29 January. Martin also scored a goal in the win over Rennes. His performances during the campaign led to his teammates and friends playfully nicknaming him "Little Xavi" in reference to the Barcelona star playmaker. Because of his great performances in midfield throughout the league campaign, Martin was one of four players nominated for the UNFP Young Player of the Year, along with Mamadou Sakho, Yann M'Vila and André Ayew.

Lille

On 20 June 2012, French club Lille confirmed on its website that Martin had joined the club after agreeing to a five-year deal. The transfer fee was undisclosed and the midfielder joined the club on 1 July.

On 13 July 2016, Martin joined newly promoted Ligue 1 club Dijon on loan, after Lille coach Frédéric Antonetti stated the player was not part of his plans for the forthcoming season. On 11 August 2017, following his return from loan at Dijon, he was released from his contract at Lille.

Reims
On 14 August 2017, Martin joined Ligue 2 side Reims on a one-year contract with the option of two further years. Martin helped Stade de Reims win the 2017–18 Ligue 2, helping promote them to the Ligue 1 for the 2018–19 season.

Later career 
In 2019, Martin signed for Chambly. He played in the club’s two seasons in Ligue 2. In 2021, he signed for Hyères, a club competing in the Championnat National 2.

International career
During his development years, Martin went unnoticed by youth national team coaches. After establishing himself as a professional, he was called up to the France under-21 team in November 2008 to participate in a friendly against Denmark. Martin made his youth international debut in the match as a starter. He was substituted out after 61 minutes as France won the match 1–0. Martin featured with the team for the rest of the campaign as France failed to qualify for the 2011 UEFA European Under-21 Championship, which effectively ended Martin's under-21 career. On 26 May 2011, after a successful league season with Sochaux, Martin was called up to the senior national team by Laurent Blanc for June fixtures against Belarus, Ukraine and Poland. The midfielder described the call up as "a dream" and made his senior international debut on 6 June in the team's friendly match against Ukraine, appearing as a second-half substitute with the match drawn 1–1. In the match, Martin scored two goals and assisted on another, which was scored by fellow debutante Younès Kaboul, as France won the match 4–1. As a result of his double, Martin became only the fourth French international, after Jean Vincent, Zinedine Zidane and Bafétimbi Gomis, to score twice on his debut.

Career statistics

Club

International
Source:

France score listed first, score column indicates score after each Martin goal

Honours
Reims
Ligue 2: 2017–18

References

External links

1988 births
Living people
Footballers from Paris
French footballers
France under-21 international footballers
France international footballers
Association football midfielders
FC Sochaux-Montbéliard players
Lille OSC players
Dijon FCO players
Stade de Reims players
FC Chambly Oise players
Hyères FC players
Ligue 1 players
Ligue 2 players
Championnat National 2 players
Championnat National 3 players
UEFA Euro 2012 players